"More Than a Woman" is a song by American R&B singer Angie Stone. It was written by Calvin Richardson, Balewa Muhammad, Eddie Ferrell, Darren Lighty, and Clifton Lighty for her second studio album Mahogany Soul (2001), with Ferrell and Darren Lighty producing the song and Richardson having featured vocals. A remixed version of the duet, which saw Richardson's vocals being replaced by Joe, was released as the album's fourth single. It peaked at number four on the US Billboard Adult R&B Songs.

Charts

References

2002 singles
2001 songs
Angie Stone songs
Joe (singer) songs
Songs written by Balewa Muhammad
2000s ballads